Geraldine Coutts is an Australian journalist and radio journalist.

Career
For many years, Geraldine Coutts was a host and presenter of Pacific Beat on Radio Australia, a position which allowed her to interview national leaders, sports stars and village people. She left the program in August 2014.

Interviewees
Among the people she has interviewed throughout her career with the ABC are Greenpeace New Zealand Oceans Campaigner Karli Thomas, director of Pacific Media Centre David Robie, Marshall Islands correspondent Giff Johnson, Australian Defence Minister Stephen Smith, New Zealand MP William Sio, attorney for the Bougainville land owners Steve Berman and Australia's Parliamentary Secretary for Pacific Island Affairs, Richard Marles.

References

Living people
Year of birth missing (living people)
Place of birth missing (living people)
ABC radio (Australia) journalists and presenters
Australian women journalists
Australian radio journalists
Women radio journalists